The Anneewakee Treatment Center was a Douglasville, Georgia, United States, based adolescent treatment center which changed name to the New Annewakee, Inner Harbour Hospital and now Inner Harbour, Ltd (DBA) Inner Harbour for Children and Families, after a major lawsuit by 110 former "patients" for $432M in 1990, represented by attorneys B. Randall Blackwood and Patricia Edelkind. There was physical and sexual abuse, exploitation of child labor, and deprivation of education from its inception in the early 1960s through to the mid 1980s.

Opening in 1962, the center was a wilderness treatment center for troubled boys. Anneewakee expanded from the single Douglasville, Georgia, center to include a boys campus near Carrabelle, Florida and a girls campus near Rockmart, Georgia. The north campus in Rockmart, Georgia is no longer a girl's campus but a shared campus. One unit which is a locked unit consists of two separate programs aimed at youths with sexual trauma and youths that have committed sexual acts deemed inappropriate in other programs and homes. The second is an extreme bootcamp/outdoors group in which are placed youths who are on the cusp of becoming adult criminals having committed adult crimes. This is a program that seeks to give the youth one last chance to comply with societal norms while receiving treatment.

Scandals emerged in the 1980s with decades long history of forced child labor, sexual abuse, physical abuse and deprivation of education. Survivors of this center today range from people who say it saved their lives, to people who refer to it as the Chernobyl of treatment centers.

Anneewakee was acquired and is now operated as Inner Harbour Ltd or DBA Inner Harbour for Children & Families. After the scandals, the court awarded the management of the organization to Hospital Corporation of America (HCA) out of Nashville, Tennessee. A medical model was instituted where care is supervised by medical doctors/psychiatrists.

In 2015, one of the former patients at the facility wrote a book about his time there. It is the only book written by a former patient. It was Anneewakee: One Boy's Journey, by Steve Salem Evans.

Up until 2001 the average stay for a person in the facility could range from ages 5 to adulthood (age 21), giving the center roughly 16 years of a youths life. Those times were changed in 2001 when restructuring of treatment methods began. Now the average stay for a youth is 30 to 90 days. The Douglasville campus is the main campus and is unisex housing girls and boys. The locked unit is composed of four separate units. Each unit is purportedly named after an Indian tribe such as Abidiban, Itanka, Kinunka, and Tawanka. The locked unit has a level system of red, green, yellow, and blue, with each level granting certain privileges and demands more participation with on-site therapists. Each therapist writes what are called BIRP notes, which are used by mental health professionals to track a patient's progress. After a patient has finished the color level system they are moved from locked unit to a campsite. Each camp is categorized by age and sex: Itanka being the teen boys camp, Kinunka being the young girls camp, Tawanka being the teen girls camp, and Abidiban being older boys camp.

References

External links

Mental health organizations in Georgia (U.S. state)
Outdoor education organizations